Aa, possibly AaAa (ˁȝˁȝ), was an ancient Egyptian architect and construction supervisor. His title was "Overseer of Construction Workers" or "Great Overseer of Construction Workers". He lived in the time of the Middle Kingdom of Egypt (between 2080 BCE and 1640 BCE). 

Aa is one of several names on a funerary stele from the northern necropolis of Abydos. The connection between Aa and the depicted Sahepu is unclear. The reading of the name is problematic; it is not clear whether the first element "Aa" forms part of the name or whether it is an adjective as part of the title.

References  

 Friedhelm Hoffmann, Christiane von Pfeil and Klein Ellguth: (Aa)Aa. In: Rainer Vollkommer: Künstlerlexikon der Antike, Nikol, Hamburg 2007, p. 1 .

Ancient Egyptian architects